Makerere University School of Public Health (MUSPH) is one of the schools that comprise the Makerere University College of Health Sciences, a constituent college of Makerere University, Uganda's oldest and largest public university.

Location
The geographical coordinates of the school are 0°20'15.0"N, 32°34'38.0"E (Latitude:0.337500; Longitude:32.577222).

As of August 2017, the school was preparing to break ground to a new five-storey headquarters building, to house innovation laboratories, auditoriums, tutorial rooms, demonstration rooms, as well as space for, postgraduate students, doctoral students, post-doctoral trainees, research fellows and visiting scholars. A total of US$3 million is needed. At that time, more than 3/4ths of the funds had been secured.

History
The origins of MUSPH date back to 1957 when the Department of Preventive Medicine was established at Makerere University Medical School. In 1975, the department was elevated to the Makerere Institute of Public Health and moved to a new five-storey building of its own. The institute was elevated to a full-fledged School of Public Health and made a constituent school of the Makerere University College of Health Sciences in 2007.

Departments
As of August 2018, MUSPH had the following departments:

 Department of Health Policy, Planning and Management
 Department of Epidemiology and Biostatistics
 Department of Community Health and Behavioural Sciences
 Department of Disease Control and Occupational Health
 Regional Centre for Quality of Health Care

Postgraduate programmes
MUSPH focuses more on graduate training than undergraduate.  As of August 2018, the school offered the following graduate programmes.

Master of Public Health (Distance Education): A 3-year distance education masters programme tailor-made for busy working health professionals who cannot afford full-time in-class coursework
Master of Public Health: A full-time 2-year Masters course
Master of Science in Health Services Research
Master of Science in Public Health Nutrition
Master of Science in Public Health Disaster Management
Masters in Health Informatics
Masters in Biostatistics

Short courses
As of August 2018, MUSPH offered the following short courses:

 Short Course in Humanitarian and Disaster Resilience Leadership
 Short Course in Community Health and Behavioural Sciences #
 Short Courses in Epidemiology and Biostatistics
 Short Course in Water, Sanitation and Hygiene.

Undergraduate courses
The following undergraduate courses are offered at MUSPH:

 Bachelor of Environmental Health Sciences: A three-year course

MUSPH offers instruction in the following undergraduate programs whose qualifications are awarded by other schools within the Makerere University College of Health Sciences:

 Bachelor of Medicine and Bachelor of Surgery: Offered by Makerere University School of Medicine
 Bachelor of Radiography: Offered by Makerere University School of Medicine
 Bachelor of Pharmacy: Offered by Makerere University School of Biomedical Sciences
 Bachelor of Science in Nursing: Offered by Makerere University School of Health Sciences
 Bachelor of Dental Surgery: Offered by Makerere University School of Health Sciences.

Senior faculty
Some of the distinguish faculty members, at MUSPH include the following:
 Professor Rhoda Wanyenze, MBChB, MPH, PhD: Physician, infectious diseases specialist, associate professor of public health. Current dean of Makerere University School of Public Health since September 2017.
 David Serwadda, MBChB, MSc, MMed, MPH: Physician, infectious diseases specialist, professor of public health. Former dean of the Makerere University School of Public Health.
 Fred Wabwire-Mangen, MBChB, DTM&H, MPH, PhD: Physician, epidemiologist, professor of public health.
 David Guwatudde, BStat, MSc, PhD: Professor of Epidemiology and Biostatistics, Department of Epidemiology and Biostatistics.
 Christopher Garimoi Orach, MBChB, DPH, MMed, MPH, PhD: Professor of public health. Head of the Department of Community Health and Behavioral Sciences at Makerere University College of Health Sciences, School of Public Health and the Deputy Dean of the school.
 Freddie Ssengooba, MD, MPH, PhD: Associate professor of public health. Head of the Department of Health Policy Planning and Management at the Makerere University College of Health Sciences, School of Public Health.
 Nazarius Tumwesigye Mbona: Associate professor of public health. Head of the Department of Epidemiology and Bio-statistics at Makerere University College of Health Sciences, School of Public Health. 
 Lynn Atuyambe, MPH, PhD: Associate professor of public health
 Elizeus Rutebemberwa, MBChB, MPH, PhD: Associate professor of public health.

Former faculty
 Professor William Bazeyo. For a period of eight years, ending in September 2017, he served as the Dean of the School. Since 15 September 2017, Professor Bazeyo is the Deputy Vice Chancellor, responsible for Finance and Administration at Makerere University.

See also
 Education in Uganda
 Makerere University
 Makerere University College of Health Sciences
 Makerere University School of Biomedical Sciences
 Makerere University School of Medicine
 Makerere University School of Health Sciences

References

External links
Website of Makerere University School of Public Health
Prof. William Bazeyo’s State Of The School Of Public Address Highlights Tremendous Success As of 31 August 2017.

Makerere University
Schools of public health
Educational institutions established in 2007
2007 establishments in Uganda